Bayeux  may refer to:

Places
Bayeux, a commune in the Calvados department in Normandy in northwestern France.
Bayeux, Brazil, a municipality in Paraíba state in northeastern Brazil.

Others
Bayeux (river)
Bayeux Tapestry
Bayeux Tapestry tituli
The Bayeux speeches
Jardin botanique de Bayeux

See also
Roman Catholic Diocese of Bayeux
Canton of Bayeux
Gare de Bayeux
Arrondissement of Bayeux
Bayeux Cathedral
Thomas of Bayeux
Poppa of Bayeux
Odo of Bayeux
Bayeux Commonwealth War Graves Commission Cemetery
Pointe Bayeux
Osbert de Bayeux
Exuperius of Bayeux
John de Bayeux